iiiDrops is the second mixtape by Chicago rapper Joey Purp. It was released on May 26, 2016. It includes guest appearances from Mick Jenkins, Saba, Teddy Jackson, TheMind, and fellow Savemoney collaborators Vic Mensa and Chance the Rapper. A music video was created for "Girls @".

Critical reception

Pitchfork included it on the "20 Best Rap Albums of 2016" list. Rolling Stone placed it at number 31 on the "40 Best Rap Albums of 2016" list. Complex placed it at number 36 on the "50 Best Albums of 2016" list. Vice placed it at number 85 on the "100 Best Albums of 2016" list.

Track listing

Notes
 Mixed by Steve Anderson at Private Stock Studios (Chicago, Illinois).
 "Girls @" & "Say You Do" mixed by Elton "L10MixedIt" Chueng at Classick Studios (Chicago, Illinois).
 Mastered by Alex "Papi Beatz" Baez at Private Stock Studios (Chicago, Illinois).
  signifies an additional producer.
 "Morning Sex" features additional vocals by Teddy Jackson and Erica Renee.
 "Escape" features additional vocals by Teddy Jackson and Knox Fortune.

References

External links
 
 

2016 mixtape albums
Albums free for download by copyright owner
Hip hop albums by American artists
Midwest hip hop albums